Võro may refer to:

 Võro people, an ethnic group of Estonia
 Võro language, a language belonging to the Baltic-Finnic branch of the Finno-Ugric languages of Estonia
 Võro Institute, the governing organization of the Võro language

Voro may refer to:
 Voro language (Adamawa), spoken in Nigeria
 Voro (footballer) (born 1963), Spanish footballer

See also
Voru (disambiguation)

Language and nationality disambiguation pages